Jessica Darrow (born January 7, 1995) is an American actress and singer best known for voicing the character Luisa Madrigal in Disney's Encanto.

Early life 
Darrow was born in Miami, Florida. She is of Cuban descent. As a teenager, she would listen to songs by Lin-Manuel Miranda and watched Disney films.

Career 
Darrow's first film role was Sarah in the 2019 film Feast of the Seven Fishes, directed by Robert Tinnell.  She rose to fame in 2021 acting in the Disney animated feature film Encanto as the voice of Luisa Madrigal. She sang one of the film's most popular songs, "Surface Pressure", which was certified platinum by the RIAA and peaked at number 8 on the Billboard Hot 100 chart in early 2022. Darrow voiced Mimi in Grand Theft Auto Onlines 2021 update "Los Santos Tuners".

Personal life 
In an interview for Deadline Hollywood, Darrow voiced her support of the LGBT community in the wake of the Parental Rights in Education Act passage in Miami, where she was born, "Here I am being queer and gorgeous, and I'm on the red carpet, and I'm very happy to represent fellow gorgeous queer people."

Filmography 

 Feast of the Seven Fishes (2019) as Sarah
 Encanto (2021) as Luisa Madrigal (voice)

Discography

Singles

As lead artist

Other charted songs

Music videos
 "Same Way (2021)
 "Surface Pressure" (2021)
 "All of You" (2021)
 "Make It Clean" (2022)

References

External links 
 

1995 births
21st-century American women singers
21st-century American singers
21st-century American actresses
Rutgers University alumni
American YouTubers
LGBT YouTubers
Actresses from Miami
American people of Cuban descent
American reggaeton musicians
Living people
Musicians from Miami
Singer-songwriters from Florida
American contraltos
American voice actresses
American lesbian actresses
American lesbian musicians
21st-century American LGBT people
American LGBT entertainers
LGBT Hispanic and Latino American people
LGBT people from Florida